Voise Lee Winters (born October 12, 1962) is an American former basketball player. He played for the Philadelphia 76ers of the National Basketball Association (NBA).

During his senior season (1980-1981) at Gage Park High School in Chicago, Winters set an Illinois high school season scoring record which still stands: he averaged 46.7 points per game.  His grand total of 1,048 points was also a record at the time, but several other players have since amassed higher totals.

He played college basketball for Bradley University from 1981 to 1985.  In his college career, he scored 1,714 points.  After the close of his college career, Winters was drafted by the Philadelphia 76ers of the NBA in the second round of the 1985 NBA draft (44th pick overall).  He appeared in 4 games for the 76ers in the 1985–86 season, averaging 1.5 points per game.

After leaving the Sixers, Winters had an extensive career in Europe, playing for 18 different teams, mainly in France, Spain and Great Britain. He now coaches Basketball and other invasion games at Ashville College, Harrogate, United Kingdom.

References

External links
Spanish League profile

1962 births
Living people
ALM Évreux Basket players
American expatriate basketball people in France
American expatriate basketball people in Israel
American expatriate basketball people in Spain
American expatriate basketball people in Switzerland
American expatriate basketball people in Turkey
American expatriate basketball people in the United Kingdom
American men's basketball players
Basketball players from Chicago
BCM Gravelines players
Bradley Braves men's basketball players
Caen Basket Calvados players
CB Breogán players
CB Girona players
Club Ourense Baloncesto players
Élan Chalon players
Fribourg Olympic players
JDA Dijon Basket players
Le Mans Sarthe Basket players
Liga ACB players
Oyak Renault basketball players
Philadelphia 76ers draft picks
Philadelphia 76ers players
Saski Baskonia players
Sheffield Sharks players
Small forwards
Union Tours Basket Métropole players